Aleksei Aleksandrovich Alyakrinsky (born 22 November 1976) is a former Russian professional footballer.

Club career
He made his debut in the Russian Premier League in 2000 for FC Chernomorets Novorossiysk. He played 2 games in the UEFA Cup 2001–02 for FC Chernomorets Novorossiysk.

Honours
 Russian Second Division Zone Center best defender: 2004.

External links
 

1976 births
Footballers from Moscow
Living people
Russian footballers
Association football defenders
FC Dynamo Moscow reserves players
FC Chernomorets Novorossiysk players
Russian Premier League players
FC Fakel Voronezh players
FC Metallurg Lipetsk players
FC Kristall Smolensk players
FC Spartak-2 Moscow players